Alexander McKay (11 April 1841 – 8 July 1917) was a New Zealand geologist. He was born in Carsphairn, Kirkcudbrightshire, Scotland on 11 April 1841.

McKay reached New Zealand in 1863 where he spent a number of years prospected for gold. A meeting with Julius von Haast saw a change of direction in which McKay, largely self-taught, undertook geological mapping and fossil collecting expeditions throughout the islands. In 1872 James Hector appointed him to the Geological Survey of New Zealand. During his geological work McKay took numerous photographs. He invented a telephoto lens and also techniques for taking images of geological collections and fossils.

McKay's greatest achievement was to free New Zealand sciences from the strictures of European-based thinking, developing new theories, of worldwide importance, on block faulting in the evolution of mountain systems. The discipline of neotectonics is largely based upon McKay's observations and theories.

References

External links
 

1841 births
1917 deaths
20th-century New Zealand geologists
Scottish emigrants to New Zealand